Impidens  is an extinct genus of large omnivorous cynodont from the Triassic of South Africa and Antarctica. Its type and only species is Impidens hancoxi. Impidens inhabited high-latitude environments of southern Gondwana during the Middle Triassic, where it was probably the apex predator.

History

A specimen of Impidens was collected from Antarctica in 1986. In 1995, it was described as an indeterminate diademodontid possibly belonging to Titanogomphodon. The holotype of Impidens hancoxi was found in South Africa in 2014. It was described as a new species in 2021, with the Antarctic specimen and a less complete specimen from South Africa being referred to the species.

Description

Classification

Impidens is a member of Trirachodontidae, a family of gomphodont cynodonts. It is closely related to its smaller contemporary Cricodon as well as the earlier Langbergia and Trirachodon.  However, the phylogeny of Trirachodontidae is not well-understood, and the family may be paraphyletic, with some species more closely related to traversodontids than others.

Paleoecology

Impidens fossils are known from the Cricodon-Ufudocyclops subzone of the Cynognathus Assemblage Zone of the Beaufort Group in South Africa and the upper Fremouw Formation in Antarctica. The dating of these strata is controversial; they are conventionally regarded as Middle Triassic in age, probably late Anisian or early Ladinian, but a biostratigraphically correlated fauna in South America has been dated to the beginning of the Late Triassic, in the early Carnian. However, another biostratigraphically correlated fauna in China has been dated to the Anisian, suggesting the traditional dating may be correct.

Impidens was probably the apex predator of its environment, as the only other large predator known to have coexisted with it was the somewhat smaller cynodont Cynognathus. The known large herbivores of the fauna are the cynodont Diademodon and the dicynodont Ufudocyclops. A smaller trirachodontid, Cricodon, was also present in the environment.

The Cricodon-Ufudocyclops subzone was deposited in a meandering river environment, with a deep channel and high banks. Both it and the Fremouw Formation were high-paleolatitude environments, which may explain some of the faunal differences between them and lower-paleolatitude fauna.

Footnotes

References

Bibliography

 
 
 

Cynognathians
Prehistoric cynodont genera
Fossil taxa described in 2021
Middle Triassic synapsids of Africa
Triassic Antarctica
Fossils of Antarctica
Extinct animals of Antarctica
Fossils of South Africa